The Socialist Party of Nigeria (SPN) is a socialist political party in Nigeria. The SPN was launched as an initiative by the Democratic Socialist Movement and held its inaugural conference in Lagos on 16 November 2013.

The SPN filed for registration as a political party in order to contest the 2015 Nigerian general election, but the Independent National Electoral Commission (INEC) refused the registration. The SPN sued the INEC at the Federal High Court, claiming that INEC had failed to respond to their petition within 30 days as prescribed by law and that thus it would have to be registered automatically. The party has since received an INEC certificate of registration and has vowed to "liberate Nigerians from economic hardship.

References

External links
Socialist Party of Nigeria

2013 establishments in Nigeria
Far-left political parties
Political parties established in 2013
Political parties in Nigeria
Socialist parties in Nigeria